David Alan Mamet (born November 30, 1947) is an American playwright, filmmaker, and author. He won a Pulitzer Prize and received Tony nominations for his plays Glengarry Glen Ross (1984) and Speed-the-Plow (1988). He first gained critical acclaim for a trio of off-Broadway 1970s plays: The Duck Variations, Sexual Perversity in Chicago, and American Buffalo. His plays Race and The Penitent, respectively, opened on Broadway in 2009 and previewed off-Broadway in 2017.

Feature films that Mamet both wrote and directed include House of Games (1987), Homicide (1991), The Spanish Prisoner (1997), and his biggest commercial success, Heist (2001). His screenwriting credits include The Postman Always Rings Twice (1981), The Verdict (1982), The Untouchables (1987), Hoffa (1992), Wag the Dog (1997), and Hannibal (2001). Mamet himself wrote the screenplay for the 1992 adaptation of Glengarry Glen Ross, and wrote and directed the 1994 adaptation of his play Oleanna (1992). He was the executive producer and a frequent writer for the TV show The Unit (2006–2009).

Mamet's books include: On Directing Film (1991), a commentary and dialogue about film-making; The Old Religion (1997), a novel about the lynching of Leo Frank; Five Cities of Refuge: Weekly Reflections on Genesis, Exodus, Leviticus, Numbers and Deuteronomy (2004), a Torah commentary with Rabbi Lawrence Kushner; The Wicked Son (2006), a study of Jewish self-hatred and antisemitism; Bambi vs. Godzilla, a commentary on the movie business; The Secret Knowledge: On the Dismantling of American Culture (2011), a commentary on cultural and political issues; and Three War Stories (2013), a trio of novellas about the physical and psychological effects of war.

Early life
Mamet was born in 1947 in Chicago to Lenore June (née Silver), a teacher, and Bernard Morris Mamet, a labor attorney. His family was Jewish. His paternal grandparents were Polish Jews. Mamet has said his parents were communists and described himself as a red diaper baby. One of his earliest jobs was as a busboy at Chicago's London House and The Second City.  He also worked as an actor, editor for Oui magazine and as a cab-driver.  He was educated at the progressive Francis W. Parker School and at Goddard College in Plainfield, Vermont. At the Chicago Public Library Foundation 20th anniversary fundraiser in 2006, though, Mamet announced "My alma mater is the Chicago Public Library. I got what little educational foundation I got in the third-floor reading room, under the tutelage of a Coca-Cola sign".

After a move to Chicago's North Side, Mamet encountered theater director Robert Sickinger, and began to work occasionally at Sickinger's Hull House Theatre. This represented the beginning of Mamet's lifelong involvement with the theater.

Career

Theater
Mamet is a founding member of the Atlantic Theater Company; he first gained acclaim for a trio of off-Broadway plays in 1976, The Duck Variations, Sexual Perversity in Chicago, and American Buffalo. He was awarded the Pulitzer Prize in 1984 for Glengarry Glen Ross, which received its first Broadway revival in the summer of 2005. His play Race, which opened on Broadway on December 6, 2009 and featured James Spader, David Alan Grier, Kerry Washington, and Richard Thomas in the cast, received mixed reviews. His play The Anarchist, starring Patti LuPone and Debra Winger, in her Broadway debut, opened on Broadway on November 13, 2012 in previews and was scheduled to close on December 16, 2012. His 2017 play The Penitent previewed off-Broadway on February 8, 2017.

In 2002, Mamet was inducted into the American Theater Hall of Fame. Mamet later received the PEN/Laura Pels Theater Award for Grand Master of American Theater in 2010.

In 2017, Mamet released an online class for writers entitled David Mamet teaches dramatic writing.

In 2019 Mamet returned to the London West End with a new play, Bitter Wheat, at the Garrick Theatre, starring John Malkovich.

Film
Mamet's first film work was as a screenwriter, later directing his own scripts.

According to Joe Mantegna, Mamet worked as a script doctor for the 1978 film Towing.

Mamet's first produced screenplay was the 1981 production of The Postman Always Rings Twice, based on James M. Cain's novel. He received an Academy Award nomination one year later for the 1982 legal drama, The Verdict. He also wrote the screenplays for The Untouchables (1987), Hoffa (1992), The Edge (1997), Wag the Dog (1997), Ronin (1998), and Hannibal (2001). He received a second Academy Award nomination for Wag the Dog.

In 1987, Mamet made his film directing debut with his screenplay House of Games, which won Best Film and Best Screenplay awards at the 1987 Venice Film Festival and the Film of the Year in 1989 from the London Film Critics' Circle Awards. The film starred his then-wife, Lindsay Crouse, and many longtime stage associates and friends,  including fellow Goddard College graduates. Mamet was quoted as saying, "It was my first film as a director and I needed support, so I stacked the deck." After House of Games, Mamet later wrote and directed two more films focusing on the world of con artists, The Spanish Prisoner (1997) and Heist (2001). Among those films, Heist enjoyed the biggest commercial success.

Other films that Mamet both wrote and directed include: Things Change (1988), Homicide (1991) (nominated for the Palme d'Or at 1991 Cannes Film Festival and won a "Screenwriter of the Year" award for Mamet from the London Film Critics' Circle Awards), Oleanna (1994), The Winslow Boy (1999), State and Main (2000), Spartan (2004), Redbelt (2008), and the 2013 bio-pic TV movie Phil Spector.

A feature-length film, a thriller titled Blackbird, was intended for release in 2015, but is still in development.

When Mamet adapted his play for the 1992 film Glengarry Glen Ross, he wrote an additional part (including the monologue "Coffee's for closers") for Alec Baldwin.

Mamet continues to work with an informal repertory company for his films, including Crouse, William H. Macy, Joe Mantegna, and Rebecca Pidgeon, as well as the aforementioned school friends.

Mamet rewrote the script for Ronin under the pseudonym "Richard Weisz" and turned in an early version of a script for Malcolm X which was rejected by director Spike Lee.  Mamet also wrote an unproduced biopic script about Roscoe Arbuckle with Chris Farley intended to portray him.  In 2000, Mamet directed a film version of Catastrophe, a one-act play by Samuel Beckett featuring Harold Pinter and John Gielgud (in his final screen performance). In 2008, he wrote and directed the mixed martial arts movie Redbelt, about a martial arts instructor tricked into fighting in a professional bout.

In On Directing Film, Mamet advocates for a method of storytelling based on Eisenstein's montage theory, stating that the story should be told through the juxtaposition of uninflected images. This method relies heavily on the cut between scenes, and Mamet urges directors to eliminate as much narration as possible. Mamet asserts that directors should focus on getting the point of a scene across, rather than simply following a protagonist, or adding visually beautiful or intriguing shots. Films should create order from disorder in search of the objective.

Books
Mamet published the essay collection Writing in Restaurants in 1986, followed by the poetry collection The Hero Pony in 1990.  He has also published a series of short plays, monologues and four novels, The Village (1994), The Old Religion (1997), Wilson: A Consideration of the Sources (2000), and Chicago (2018). He has written several non-fiction texts, and children's stories, including True and False: Heresy and Common Sense for the Actor (1997).  In 2004 he published a lauded version of the classical Faust story, Faustus, however, when the play was staged in San Francisco during the spring of 2004, it was not well received by critics. On May 1, 2010, Mamet released a graphic novel The Trials of Roderick Spode (The Human Ant).

Mamet detailed his conversion from modern liberalism to "a reformed liberal" in The Secret Knowledge: On the Dismantling of American Culture in 2011. Mamet published Three War Stories, a collection of novellas, in 2013 ; the novel The Diary of a Porn Star by Priscilla Wriston-Ranger: As Told to David Mamet With an Afterword by Mr. Mamet in 2019; and the political commentary Recessional: The Death of Free Speech and the Cost of a Free Lunch in 2022.

Television and radio 
Mamet wrote one episode of Hill Street Blues, "A Wasted Weekend", that aired in 1987. His then-wife, Lindsay Crouse, appeared in numerous episodes (including that one) as Officer McBride. Mamet is also the creator, producer and frequent writer of the television series The Unit, where he wrote a well-circulated memo to the writing staff. He directed a third-season episode of The Shield with Shawn Ryan. In 2007, Mamet directed two television commercials for Ford Motor Company. The two 30-second ads featured the Ford Edge and were filmed in Mamet's signature style of fast-paced dialogue and clear, simple imagery. Mamet's sister, Lynn, is a producer and writer for television shows, such as The Unit and Law & Order.

Mamet has contributed several dramas to BBC Radio through Jarvis & Ayres Productions, including an adaptation of Glengarry Glen Ross for BBC Radio 3 and new dramas for BBC Radio 4. The comedy Keep Your Pantheon (or On the Whole I'd Rather Be in Mesopotamia) was aired in 2007. The Christopher Boy's Communion was another Jarvis & Ayres production, first broadcast on BBC Radio 4 on March 8, 2021.

Archives 
The papers of David Mamet were sold to the Harry Ransom Center at the University of Texas at Austin in 2007 and first opened for research in 2009. The growing collection consists mainly of manuscripts and related production materials for most of his plays, films, and other writings, but also includes his personal journals from 1966 to 2005. In 2015, the Ransom Center secured a second major addition to Mamet's papers, including more recent works. Additional materials relating to Mamet and his career can be found in the Ransom Center's collections of Robert De Niro, Mel Gussow, Tom Stoppard, Sam Shepard, Paul Schrader, Don DeLillo, and John Russell Brown.

Critical reception

"Mamet speak"

Mamet's style of writing dialogue, marked by a cynical, street-smart edge, precisely crafted for effect, is so distinctive that it has come to be called Mamet speak. Mamet himself has criticized his (and other writers') tendency to write "pretty" at the expense of sound, logical plots. When asked how he developed his style for writing dialogue, Mamet said, "In my family, in the days prior to television, we liked to while away the evenings by making ourselves miserable, based solely on our ability to speak the language viciously. That's probably where my ability was honed."

One instance of Mamet's dialogue style can be found in Glengarry Glen Ross, in which two down-on-their-luck real estate salesmen are considering stealing from their employer's office. George Aaronow and Dave Moss equivocate on the meaning of "talk" and "speak", turning language and meaning to deceptive purposes:

Moss No. What do you mean? Have I talked to him about this [Pause]
Aaronow Yes. I mean are you actually talking about this, or are we just...
Moss No, we're just...
Aaronow We're just "talking" about it.
Moss We're just speaking about it. [Pause] As an idea.
Aaronow As an idea.
Moss Yes.
Aaronow We're not actually talking about it.
Moss No.
Aaronow Talking about it as a...
Moss No.
Aaronow As a robbery.
Moss As a "robbery?" No.

Mamet dedicated Glengarry Glen Ross to Harold Pinter, who was instrumental in its being first staged at the Royal National Theatre, (London) in 1983, and whom Mamet has acknowledged as an influence on its success, and on his other work.

Gender issues
Mamet's plays have frequently sparked debate and controversy. Following a 1992 staging of Oleanna, a play in which a college student  accuses her professor of trying to rape her, a critic reported that the play divided the audience by gender and recounted that "couples emerged screaming at each other".

In his 2014 book David Mamet and Male Friendship, Arthur Holmberg examined Mamet's portrayal of male friendships, especially focusing on the contradictions and ambiguities of male bonding as dramatized in Mamet's plays and films.

Personal life
Mamet and actress Lindsay Crouse married in 1977 and divorced in 1990. The couple have two children, Willa and Zosia. Willa was a professional photographer and is now a singer/songwriter; Zosia is an actress. Mamet has been married to actress and singer-songwriter Rebecca Pidgeon since 1991, and they have two children, Clara and Noah. , Mamet and Pidgeon live in Santa Monica, California.

Mamet is a Reform Jew and strongly pro-Israel.

Political views
In 2005, Mamet became a contributing blogger for The Huffington Post, drawing satirical cartoons with themes including political strife in Israel. In a 2008 essay at The Village Voice titled "Why I Am No Longer a 'Brain-Dead Liberal'" he discussed how his political views had shifted from liberalism to conservatism. In interviews, Mamet has highlighted his agreement with free market theorists such as Friedrich Hayek, the historian Paul Johnson, and economist Thomas Sowell, whom Mamet called "one of our greatest minds". In 2022, Mamet declined to explicitly label himself a Republican, but described himself as a conservative who "would like to conserve those things I grew up with: the love of family, the love of the country, love of service, love of God, love of community". 

During promotion of a book, Mamet said British people had "a taint of anti-semitism," claiming they "want to give [Israel] away to some people whose claim is rather dubious." In the same interview, Mamet went on to say that "there are famous dramatists and novelists [in the UK] whose works are full of anti-Semitic filth." He refused to give examples because of British libel laws (the interview was conducted in New York City for the Financial Times). He is known for his pro-Israel positions; in his book The Secret Knowledge he claimed that "Israelis would like to live in peace within their borders; the Arabs would like to kill them all."

Mamet endorsed Republican Mitt Romney for president in 2012, and wrote an article for The Jewish Journal of Greater Los Angeles imploring fellow Jewish Americans to vote for Romney.

In an essay for Newsweek, published on January 29, 2013, Mamet argued against gun control laws: "It was intended to guard us against this inevitable decay of government that the Constitution was written. Its purpose was and is not to enthrone a Government superior to an imperfect and confused electorate, but to protect us from such a government."

Mamet has described the NFL anthem protests as "absolutely fucking despicable". In a 2020 interview, he described Donald Trump as a "great president" and supported his re-election. After Trump was defeated for re-election, Mamet appeared to endorse false claims that the election had been illegitimate in his 2022 book Recessional: The Death of Free Speech and the Cost of a Free Lunch, though shortly after its publication, he said he "misspoke" on the subject.

In 2022, Mamet made comments in support of Florida House Bill 1557, formally dubbed Parental Rights in Education and branded the "Don't Say Gay" bill by its critics, which places restrictions on the ability of public school teachers in the state to discuss sexual orientation and gender identity with children in kindergarten through third grade. In an interview with Fox News, Mamet claimed that the law was necessary because teachers "are abusing [children] mentally and using sex to do so", further alleging that "teachers are inclined, particularly men because men are predators, to pedophilia".

Works

Plays
 Lakeboat (1970)
 The Duck Variations (1972)
 Lone Canoe (1972)
 Sexual Perversity in Chicago (1974)
 Squirrels (1974)
 American Buffalo (1975)
 Reunion (1976)
 The Water Engine (1976)
 A Life in the Theatre (1977)
 The Woods (1977)
 The Revenge of the Space Pandas, or Binky Rudich and the Two-Speed Clock (1978)
 Mr. Happiness (1978)
 Prairie du Chien (1979)
 The Blue Hour (1979)
 Lakeboat (revision) (1980)
 Edmond (1982)
 The Frog Prince (1983)
 Glengarry Glen Ross (1983)
 The Shawl (1985)
 Goldberg Street: Short Plays and Monologues (1985)
 The Poet & The Rent (1986)
 Speed-the-Plow (1988)
 Bobby Gould in Hell (1989)
 Oleanna (1992)
 The Cryptogram (1994)
 The Old Neighborhood (1997)
 Boston Marriage (1999)
 Faustus (2004)
 Romance (2005)
 The Voysey Inheritance (adaptation) (2005)
 Keep Your Pantheon (2007)
 November (2007)
 The Vikings and Darwin (2008)
 Race (2009)
 School (2009)
 The Anarchist (2012)
 China Doll (2015)
 The Penitent (2017)
 Bitter Wheat (2019)
 The Christopher Boy's Communion (2020)

Films

TV movies

Books
 Writing in Restaurants (1987)
 Some Freaks (1989)
 On Directing Film (1991)
 The Cabin: Reminiscence and Diversions (1992)
 The Village (1994)
 A Whore's Profession (1994)
 Make-Believe Town: Essays and Remembraces (1996)
 The Old Religion (1997)
 Three Uses of the Knife (1998)
 True and False: Heresy and Common Sense for the Actor (1999)
 The Chinaman (1999)
 Jafsie and John Henry: Essays (1999)
 Wilson: A Consideration of the Sources (2000)
 South of the Northeast Kingdom (2002)
 The Wicked Son: Anti-Semitism, Self-hatred, and the Jews (2006)
 Bambi Vs. Godzilla: On the Nature, Purpose, and Practice of the Movie Business (2007)
 Theatre (2010)
 The Trials of Roderick Spode (The Human Ant) (2010)
 The Secret Knowledge: On the Dismantling of American Culture (2011)
 Three War Stories (2013)
 Chicago (2018)
 The Diary of a Porn Star by Priscilla Wriston-Ranger: As Told to David Mamet With an Afterword by Mr. Mamet (2019)
 Recessional: The Death of Free Speech and the Cost of a Free Lunch (2022)

Awards and nominations

Theatre

Film

Television

References

Further reading
 
 Radavich, David. "Man among Men: David Mamet's Homosocial Order". American Drama 1:1 (Fall 1991): 46–60.
 Radavich, David. "Rabe, Mamet, Shepard, and Wilson: Mid-American Male Dramatists of the 1970s and '80s". The Midwest Quarterly XLVIII: 3 (Spring 2007): 342–58.

External links

 David Mamet Papers at the Harry Ransom Center
 

 
1947 births
Living people
20th-century American Jews
20th-century American dramatists and playwrights
20th-century American male writers
21st-century American Jews
21st-century American dramatists and playwrights
21st-century American male writers
Activists against antisemitism
American Orthodox Jews
American acting theorists
American male dramatists and playwrights
American male screenwriters
American male television writers
American people of Polish-Jewish descent
American television directors
American television writers
Baalei teshuva
Film directors from Vermont
Film producers from Illinois
Goddard College alumni
Jewish American dramatists and playwrights
Jewish American film directors
Jewish American screenwriters
Jewish American writers
Members of the American Academy of Arts and Letters
Neighborhood Playhouse School of the Theatre alumni
People from Plainfield, Vermont
Pulitzer Prize for Drama winners
Screenwriters from Illinois
Screenwriters from Vermont
Television producers from Illinois
Writers from Chicago